Simon Hald Jensen (born 29 September 1994) is a Danish handball player for SG Flensburg-Handewitt and the Danish national team.

Individual awards
Most Valuable Player (MVP) of the Youth World Championship: 2013

References

External links

1994 births
Living people
Sportspeople from Aalborg
Danish male handball players
Aalborg Håndbold players
Expatriate handball players
Danish expatriate sportspeople in Germany
Handball-Bundesliga players
SG Flensburg-Handewitt players